Table tennis at the 2020 Summer Paralympics in Tokyo, Japan took place at the Tokyo Metropolitan Gymnasium. There were 280 qualified slots (174 male, 106 female) which competed in male and female events.

The 2020 Summer Olympic and Paralympic Games were postponed to 2021 due to the COVID-19 pandemic. They kept the 2020 name and were held from 24 August to 5 September 2021.

Classification 

There are 11 classifications in table tennis. Classes 1 – 5 are assigned to athletes who sit in a wheelchair while competing. Classes 6 – 10 are assigned to athletes who stands while competing. The lower number indicates a greater degree of impairment. Class 11 is for athletes with intellectual impairment.

Qualification

Events
31 events were contested. The events are men's and women's team and individual competitions for the various disability classifications.

Participating nations
As of 25 August 2021.

 

 (Host country)

Schedule
 
Men

Women

Medal table

Medalists

Men

Women

See also
Table tennis at the 2020 Summer Olympics

References

External links
Results book 

 
2020 Summer Paralympics events
2020
Table tennis competitions in Japan
Paralympics